Rovering to Success is a life-guide book for Rovers written and illustrated by Robert Baden-Powell and published in two editions from June 1922. It has a theme of paddling a canoe through life. The original edition and printings of second edition were subtitled "A Book of Life-Sport for Young Men" but this was changed to "A Guide for Young Manhood" in the later printings.

Origins of the book
In 1921, Baden-Powell set about writing a book to accompany The Boy Scouts Association's Rover program which had been suggested in August 1918 and launched in November 1919. The manuscript was typed by Baden-Powell's wife Olave in November 1921 and Rovering to Success was published in June 1922 by Herbert Jenkins.

Contents
Rovering to Success sets out a philosophy for living in the adult world rather than being an instructional handbook. It is written in the style of advice from a father or wise uncle, indeed some commentators have suggested that it was partly intended for future reading by Baden-Powell's son, Peter, who was nine years old when it was published. In common with his other handbooks, The theme of Rovering to Success is taken from the popular 19th-century song; “Never sit down with a tear or a frown, but paddle your own canoe”, which was written by the American poet Sarah T. Bolton in 1850 but is not attributed.

The first chapter is entitled How to be happy though rich – or poor is an overview of Baden-Powell’s ideas for leading a happy and fulfilled life, enlivened with anecdotes from his military career and quotes from personalities as diverse as Abraham Lincoln, Mark Twain and Tennyson. The next five chapters are described as ”Rocks you are likely to bump on” (while paddling your own canoe). They are: "I. Horses" which deals with gambling, II. Wine on the perils of alcohol abuse, III. Women, which includes some very basic sex education which was considered ground-breaking at the time, but includes Victorian ideas of racial purity and abstinence. IV. Cuckoos and Humbugs which warns against political extremism but encourages political public service, and finally V. Irreligion, in which Baden-Powell contends that understanding of God can be found through nature study and helping others, and includes a quote from The Quran. The last chapter of the book, Rovering – the Aim of the Rover Brotherhood, explains the purpose and structure of Rovering and gives a wide range of suggestions for activities and service projects that Rovers could undertake. The book finishes with the last two verses (switched in order) of “The Call of the Wild" from “Songs of a Sourdough” by Robert W. Service, and the message; "Happiness is yours if only you paddle your canoe aright. With all my heart I wish you success, and the Scouts’ wish – GOOD CAMPING!".

Legacy
The book had two editions, the second ran to 26 impressions in the United Kingdom, the last appearing in 1964. The book continued in use as the handbook of the Rover section of The Scout Association until 1966, when The Chief Scouts' Advance Party Report recommended that "a new Training Section be formed to replace the existing Senior Scout and Rover Scout Sections".

References

Scouting
1922 non-fiction books